Dommett is a surname. Notable people with the surname include:

Joel Dommett (born 1985), British comedian, television presenter and actor
John Dommett (1946–2004), Australian actor, writer and director
Leonard Dommett (1928–2006), Australian violinist, conductor and teacher
Roy Leonard Dommett CBE (25 June 1933 – 2 November 2015) British Chief Scientist